Do Thug is a 1975 Indian film directed by S. D. Narang. The film has a very popular song "Ye Duniya To Bas Paise Ki" by Asha Bhosle.

Plot

Cast 

 Shatrughan Sinha as Madan and Ravi
 Hema Malini as Reena
 Keshto Mukherjee as Jaggu
 Nisar Ahmad Ansari as Doctor
 Dev Kumar as Mr Kishori Lal
 Fariyal as Rita
 Ajit as Ranjit
 Durga Khote
 Maruti
 Madhu Malini as Shobha
 Kanan Kaushal as Mrs Padma Lal
 M. Rajan as Michael
 Dhirajkumar as Police Inspector Dhiraj

Soundtrack
Lyrics: Rajendra Krishan

"Humne Karjke Mohabbat" - Asha Bhosle, Kishore Kumar
"Lo Aaj Maine Chehre Se" - Asha Bhosle, Usha Timothy
"O Thandi Thandi Rut" - Asha Bhosle
"Ye Duniya To Hai Bas Paise Ki" - Asha Bhosle

External links 
 

1975 films
1970s Hindi-language films
Films scored by Kalyanji Anandji